The anterior superior iliac spine (abbreviated: ASIS) is a bony projection of the iliac bone, and an important landmark of surface anatomy. It refers to the anterior extremity of the iliac crest of the pelvis. It provides attachment for the inguinal ligament, and the sartorius muscle. The tensor fasciae latae muscle attaches to the lateral aspect of the superior anterior iliac spine, and also about 5 cm away at the iliac tubercle.

Structure 
The anterior superior iliac spine refers to the anterior extremity of the iliac crest of the pelvis. This is a key surface landmark, and easily palpated. It provides attachment for the inguinal ligament, the sartorius muscle, and the tensor fasciae latae muscle.

A variety of structures lie close to the anterior superior iliac spine, including the subcostal nerve, the femoral artery (which passes between it and the pubic symphysis), and the iliohypogastric nerve.

Clinical significance 

The anterior superior iliac spine provides a clue in identifying some other clinical landmarks, including McBurney's point, Roser-Nélaton line, and true leg length. It is an important surface landmark for various surgical approaches, such as treatment of hernia. The severity of symptoms of damage to the iliohypogastric nerve can show whether damage occurred above or below the anterior superior iliac spine.

Bone may be harvested from the nearby iliac crest for use elsewhere in the body. As the subcostal nerve lies close to the anterior superior iliac spine, this is put at risk of damage.

The iliotibial tract may be irritated where it passes over the anterior superior iliac spine in iliotibial band syndrome.

Additional images

See also 
 Bone terminology
 Anatomical terms of location
 Ilium (bone)
 Human anatomical terms

References

External links

 
 Diagram at Wayne State

Skeletal system
Bones of the pelvis
Ilium (bone)